Leslie Brooks (born Virginia Leslie Gettman; July 13, 1922 – July 1, 2011) was an American film actress, model and dancer.

Early life
Born in Lincoln, Nebraska, her parents brought her to Southern California at an early age, where around 1940 she started work as a photographic model. At the beginning of her showbiz career she appeared as Lorraine Gettman.

Career
As Leslie Brooks, she began appearing in movie bit roles for Columbia in 1941. Brooks started landing more sizable parts in such movies as Nine Girls (1944), Cover Girl (1944), and the lead in the film noir classic Blonde Ice (1948). She retired from films in 1949, but returned to make one last film in 1971.

Personal life
Brooks was born in Lincoln, Nebraska on July 13, 1922, daughter of Paul and Fern Clark Gettman. She spent much of her childhood with her paternal grandparents who ran a hotel in Crofton, and attended high school in Omaha. Brooks was married twice and had four daughters. She wed her first husband, actor Donald Anthony Shay, January 6, 1945, in Beverly Hills, California. They had a daughter, Leslie Victoria (b. 1945), and divorced in 1948. She married Russ Vincent in 1950, and remained married until his death 51 years later. Brooks and Vincent had three daughters together; Dorena Marla (b. 1954), Gina L. (b. 1956) and Darla R. (b. 1960).

Death
Brooks died on July 1, 2011, at the age of 88 in Sherman Oaks, California and was buried at the Forest Lawn, Hollywood Hills Cemetery in Los Angeles.

Selected filmography

 Yankee Doodle Dandy (1942) as Chorus Girl in "Little Johnny Jones" (uncredited)
 You Were Never Lovelier (1942) as Cecy Acuña
 Lucky Legs (1942) as Jewel Perkins
 Overland to Deadwood (1942) as Linda Banning
 Underground Agent (1942) as Ann Carter
 Two Señoritas from Chicago (1943) as Lena Worth
 City Without Men (1943) as Gwen
 What's Buzzin', Cousin? (1943) as Josie (1943)
 Nine Girls (1944) as Roberta Holloway
 Cover Girl (1944) as Maurine Martin
 Tonight and Every Night (1945) as Angela
 I Love a Bandleader (1945) as Ann Stuart
 The Secret of the Whistler (1946) as Kay Morrell
 The Man Who Dared (1946) as Lorna Claibourne
 Cigarette Girl (1947) as Ellen Wilcox
 Romance on the High Seas (1948) as Miss Medwick
 Blonde Ice (1948) as Claire Cummings Hanneman
 Hollow Triumph (1948) as Virginia Taylor 
 The Cobra Strikes (1948) as Olga Kaminoff
 How's Your Love Life? (1971) as Dr. Maureen John

References

External links

 
 
 1940's Photos of Leslie Brooks by Ned Scott

1922 births
2011 deaths
American film actresses
Actresses from California
Actresses from Nebraska
Actors from Lincoln, Nebraska
Burials at Forest Lawn Memorial Park (Hollywood Hills)
20th-century American actresses
21st-century American women